Surendra Kumar Kushwaha is a Member of Uttar Pradesh Legislative Assembly from Fazilnagar Assembly constituency. He was elected to Uttar Pradesh Legislature as a candidate of Bhartiya Janata Party in 2022 Assembly elections. Kushwaha defeated Swami Prasad Maurya of Samajwadi Party in this election. Kushwaha, who was a teacher in earlier part of his life, before becoming a Member of Legislative Assembly, was employed in the Pawanagar Mahavir Inter college (Kushinagar), as a teacher of Social Studies.

References

People from Kushinagar district
Bharatiya Janata Party politicians from Uttar Pradesh
Uttar Pradesh MLAs 2022–2027